Top 20 Country Countdown was a weekly television show that aired on Great American Country (GAC), a United States country music television station, from 2004 to 2018. Fans voted for their favorite videos at Great American Country's website and the results were counted down every Friday. The show was hosted by Nan Kelley.

Number one videos

2004

2005

2007

2008

2009

2010

2011

2012

2013

2014

2015

2016

External links

American music chart television shows
2000s American music television series
2010s American music television series
2004 American television series debuts
2018 American television series endings
Great American Country original programming